A Time for Mercy, a legal thriller novel by American author John Grisham, is the sequel to A Time to Kill (his first novel, published in 1989) and Sycamore Row (published in 2013). The latest book features the return of the character Jake Brigance, a small-town Mississippi lawyer who takes on difficult cases. The novel was released on 13 October 2020.

Once again, Brigance is the court-appointed lawyer who seeks truth and justice for his client, in this case a sixteen-year-old boy named Drew Gamble, who is charged with murdering a law enforcement officer and faces the death penalty. As Jake digs into the details of the case, he knows he has to find a way to save the boy, even at the risk of his career and his family's safety.

Plot
In 1990, five years after successfully defending accused murderer Carl Lee Hailey (in A Time to Kill, the first book in the series), attorney Jake Brigance of fictional Clanton (Ford County), Mississippi, is assigned by Circuit Court Judge Omar Noose to the case of 16-year-old Drew Gamble. The boy was accused of murder after he shot and killed Stuart Kofer, a deputy sheriff who was his mother Josie's boyfriend. 

After Josie, along with her 14-year-old daughter Kiera and Drew, moved in with Kofer, the deputy beat them on many occasions after coming home drunk. Josie called 911 several times but never pressed charges. Since Kofer performed well when he was sober and was well-liked by his fellow officers, no reports were filed, and Sheriff Ozzie Walls was unaware of Kofer's violent tendencies when he was drunk. On the night of the murder, Kofer again came home in a drunken rage and knocked Josie unconscious while breaking her jaw. Both Drew and Kiera thought their mother was dead and were afraid of what Kofer might do after he came to from his stupor. After calling 911 to report the situation, Drew used Kofer's service pistol to shoot the deputy in the head. 

Taking the case puts Brigance at odds with most of the residents of Clanton, as well as the local law enforcement community, including his longtime friend Sheriff Walls. He tries to convince Judge Noose to find another lawyer to defend young Gamble but to no avail. Meanwhile, Brigance and his associate Harry Rex Vonner are working on a tort case against the Central and Southern Railroad. The case involves the death of a young family named Smallwood in a collision with a train at a poorly maintained crossing. Brigance needs to win that case, also in Judge Noose's court, in order to pay the costs of defending Drew Gamble, as Drew's mother is penniless and the government will only pay Brigance a small stipend of $1,000.

With the assistance of his paralegal Portia Lang and the advice of his mentor Lucien Wilbanks, Brigance puts together a case he hopes will sway at least some jurors to find young Gamble not guilty. The strategy is based on the fact that Kiera Gamble is pregnant after being sexually assaulted by Kofer. By concealing the pregnancy until the trial, the element of surprise does indeed have the desired effect, resulting in a hung jury and the release of Drew Gamble on bail. Because Josie Gamble wants her daughter to avoid the problems she had faced as a young mother, she agrees to let Brigance and his wife Carla adopt the baby.

Meanwhile, Judge Noose orders Ford County to pay Brigance in full for his time and expenses of defending Drew Gamble, a decision which is promptly appealed by the attorney for the county. In addition, Wilbanks suggests a way for Brigance to get the Smallwood case moved to chancery court, where the case can be tried without a jury and Judge Reuben Atlee will undoubtedly force the railroad into a settlement.

Major themes
Bible Belt attitudes towards abortion vs. adoption and capital punishment for underage defendants
Domestic violence
Sexual abuse
Police code of silence
Justifiable homicide
Aspects of the U.S. Legal system: professional courtesy, play by the rules, justice prevails

Background
A Time for Mercy is the sequel to A Time to Kill (Grisham's first novel, published in 1989) and Sycamore Row (published in 2013). The latest novel includes several characters from the previous books, in particular Jake Brigance, a small-town Mississippi lawyer. As in the first book, Brigance is stuck with a client whose understandable reasons for committing murder do not change the fact of his guilt. And, like in both of the earlier books, Brigance ends up with an unpopular defendant in a very divisive trial.

Reception
Early reviewers had mixed reactions to A Time for Mercy. Sarah Lyall of The New York Times liked the leisurely pace of the suspenseful story and the character development but found aspects of the plot unsatisfying. David Gernert, writing for Publishers Weekly, thought the book was disappointing and suitable only for diehard Grisham fans. Kirkus Reviews agreed that the book would please devotees of Grisham but noted that the ending was "oddly inconclusive."

References

2020 American novels
American thriller novels
Doubleday (publisher) books
Fiction set in 1990
Legal thriller novels
Novels by John Grisham
Novels set in the 1990s
Novels set in Mississippi
Sequel novels